Sovandeb Chattopadhyay  is an Indian politician representing All India Trinamool Congress and is the first elected MLA of the party, elected in 1998. He was the founder president of INTTUC the labour wing of his party Trinamool Congress.

He was the Government Chief Whip of his first TMC government in the West Bengal Vidhan Sabha from 2011 to 2016. On 27 May 2016 he took charge as the Hon'ble Minister of Power & Non Conventional Energy, Government of West Bengal.

A boxer in his younger days, he is a veteran trade union leader, armed with degrees in science and law. He is president of Kolkata Auto Rickshaw Operators’ Union.

Sobhandeb Chattopadhyay won the Baruipur seat as a Congress candidate in 1991 and 1996 and as a Trinamool Congress candidate won the Rasbehari seat in 2001 and 2006. In 2011 he was pitted against a green-horn and won by nearly 50,000 votes and was further re-elected in 2016. Currently he is the Minister-in-Charge, Department of Power and Non Conventional Energy Sources in the Government of West Bengal. He resigned from his seat in the Bhabanipur (Vidhan Sabha constituency) for CM Mamata Banerjee to contest West Bengal Legislative Assembly by-elections.
He then contested the by election from khardah assembly constituency and won with a margin of 93,832 votes.

References

Living people
Trinamool Congress politicians from West Bengal
1944 births
West Bengal politicians
Indian National Congress politicians